St. George is a city in and the county seat of Washington County, Utah, United States. Located in southwestern Utah on the Arizona border, it is the principal city of the St. George Metropolitan Statistical Area (MSA). The city lies in the northeasternmost part of the Mojave Desert, adjacent to the Pine Valley Mountains and near the convergence of three distinct geologic areas and ecoregions: the Mojave Desert, Colorado Plateau, and the Great Basin.

As of the 2020 U.S Census, the city had a population of 95,342, with the overall MSA having an estimated population of 180,279. St. George is the seventh-largest city in Utah and most populous city in the state outside of the Wasatch Front.

The city was settled in 1861 as a cotton mission, earning it the nickname "Dixie". While the crop never became a successful commodity, the area steadily grew in population. Between 2000 and 2005, St. George emerged as the fastest growing metropolitan area in the United States. Today, the St. George region is well known for its year-round outdoor recreation and proximity to several state parks, Zion National Park and The Grand Canyon. Utah Tech University is located in St. George and is an NCAA Division I institution.

History

Prior to the arrival of the first European settlers, the St. George area was inhabited by the Virgin River Ancestral Puebloans and later by the Southern Paiute tribe. The first Europeans in the area were part of the Domínguez–Escalante expedition in 1776.

St. George was founded as a cotton mission in 1861 under the direction of apostle Erastus Snow. It was called Dixie by Brigham Young, who was president of the Church of Jesus Christ of Latter-day Saints (LDS Church). While early settlers cultivated cotton as a commodity crop, they did not succeed in producing it at competitive market rates; consequently, cotton farming was eventually abandoned. More important to the economy was tourism, which developed as the railroads began to carry visitors to the nearby Zion National Park.

At the outbreak of the American Civil War in 1861, Young organized the settlement of what is now Washington County.
Fearing that the war would take away the cotton supply, he began plans for raising enough in this southwestern country to supply the needs of his people. Enough favorable reports had come to him from this warm region below the rim of the Great Basin, that he was convinced cotton could be raised successfully here. At the general church conference in Salt Lake City on October 6th, 1861, about three hundred families were "called" to the Dixie mission to promote the cotton industry. Most of the people knew nothing of this expedition until their names were read from the pulpit; but in nearly every case, they responded with good will, and made ready to leave within the month's time allotted to them. The families were selected so as to ensure the communities the right number of farmers, masons, blacksmiths, businessmen, educators, carpenters, as needed.

The settlement was named after George A. Smith, an LDS Church apostle.

In April 1877, the LDS Church completed the St. George Utah Temple. It is the church's third and oldest continually-operating temple in the world (the temple has been closed since November 2019 for renovation).

St. George was the location of the 1997 United States Academic Decathlon national finals.

In January 2005, a 100-year flood occurred throughout the region, due to prolonged heavy rainfall overflowing both the Virgin and Santa Clara rivers. One person was killed and 28 homes were destroyed by the Santa Clara River.

Nuclear contamination
In the early 1950s, St. George received the brunt of the fallout of above-ground nuclear testing at the Yucca Flats/Nevada Test Site northwest of Las Vegas. Winds routinely carried the fallout of these tests directly through the St. George and southern Utah area. Marked increases in the frequency of cancer in the population, not limited to leukemia, lymphoma, thyroid cancer, breast cancer, melanoma, bone cancer, brain tumors, and gastrointestinal tract cancers, were reported from the mid-1950s until the early 1980s.

In 1980, American popular weekly magazine People reported that from about 220 cast and crew who filmed in a 1956 movie, The Conqueror, on location near St. George, ninety-one had come down with cancer, and 50 had died of cancer.  Of these, forty-six had died of cancer by 1980. Among the cancer deaths were John Wayne, Pedro Armendáriz  and Susan Hayward, the stars of the film. However, the lifetime odds of developing cancer for men in the U.S. population are 43 percent and the odds of dying of cancer are 23 percent (38 percent and 19 percent, respectively, for women). This places the cancer mortality rate for the 220 primary cast and crew quite near the expected average.

A 1962 United States Atomic Energy Commission report found children living in St. George, Utah, at the time of the fallout may have received doses to the thyroid of radioiodine as high as 120 to 440 rads" (1.2 to 4.4 Gy).

Geography

According to the United States Census Bureau, the city has a total area of 64.9 square miles (168.0 km2), of which 64.4 square miles (166.8 km2)  is land and 0.5 square mile (1.2 km2)  (0.72%) is water. St. George lies in a desert valley, with most of the city lying below 3,000 feet (900 m). It is situated near a geological transition zone where the Colorado Plateau and Great Basin converge. The Beaver Dam Mountains/Utah Hill lie to the west, the Red Cliffs National Conservation Area and Pine Valley Mountains to the north, the western edge of the Colorado Plateau and Zion National Park to the east, and the Arizona Strip to the south. The Virgin River and Santa Clara River flow through the St. George valley and converge near the western base of Webb Hill near the city center.

The city uses street numbers rather than names, such as "East 100 South". Exceptions have been made for streets with curves or those not fitting into the traditional grid system. Some roads have names along with numerals, such as "400 East" which is also known as "Flood Street".

Climate
St. George's arid climate is significantly warmer on average than the rest of the state, and more closely resembles nearby Las Vegas. The climate is cold arid (BWk). St. George has hot summers and cool to relatively mild winters. There are approximately 60 mornings where the low temperature drops to the freezing mark, with the historical average window between November 12 and March 14.

The record high minimum temperature is  set on July 15, 1970 and July 3, 2013. Nighttime freezes are common during the winter due to radiational cooling.

The city has abundant sunshine year-round and averages about 300 sunny days per year, with an average  of precipitation annually. Record breaking wide spread flooding occurred during January 2005 when area creeks and rivers far exceeded their banks and washed out homes and some neighborhoods. The wettest month has been January 1993, when  fell. Precipitation is fairly evenly distributed throughout the year, except for a markedly drier period from April through June, which occurs after the Pacific storm season ends, but before the southwest monsoon begins, usually in mid-July. Precipitation mostly comes from the Pacific Ocean from late fall through early spring. The storm track usually lifts north of the city by mid-April. The monsoon brings localized and often intense thunderstorms from early July through mid-September.

The earliest snowfall was measured on October 29, 1971, and the latest on April 11, 1927.
The most recent major snow event was on December 8, 2013, when between  virtually shut down the city, making it the third heaviest snowfall in the city's history. The cold spell killed or severely damaged much of the area's non-native vegetation, such as the Mexican fan palm trees.

Demographics

 the largest self-reported ancestry groups in St. George are:

In 2018, the city's population was estimated at 87,178. St. George was declared the fourth fastest-growing metropolitan area in the United States in 2018.

, there were 27,552 households. The population density was 1,135 people per square mile. The city's racial makeup was 87.2% White, 0.7% African-American, 1.5% Native American, 0.8% Asian, 1.0% Pacific Islander, and 8.9% from other races. 12.8% of the population was Hispanic or Latino of any race.

As of the 2000 census, there were 17,367 households, out of which 34.2% had children under the age of 18 living with them, 63.6% were married couples living together, 8.6% had a female householder with no husband present, and 24.9% were non-families. 19.4% of all households were made up of individuals, and 10.2% had someone living alone who was 65 years old or older. The average household size was 2.81 individuals and the average family size was 3.21.

In the city, the age distribution of the population showed 28.4% under the age of 18, 13.7% from 18 to 24, 22.0% from 25 to 44, 16.8% from 45 to 64, and 19.3% who were 65 years of age or older. The median age was 31 years. For every 100 females, there were 94.5 males. For every 100 females age 18 and over, there were 91.2 males.

The median income for a household in the city was $36,505, and the median income for a family was $41,788. Males had a median income of $31,106 versus $20,861 for females. The per capita income for the city was $17,022. About 7.4% of families and 11.6% of the population were below the poverty line, including 14.4% of those under age 18 and 4.4% of those age 65 or over. A significant portion of the over 65 population was "snowbirds", who live in St. George during the winter.

Religion

Approximately 78.0% of St. George's residents identify as religious; below are statistics :
 63.4% LDS Church 
 4.4% Catholic
 0.8% Seventh-day Adventist
 0.6% Baptist
 0.5% Lutheran
 0.4% Southern Baptist
 0.3% Presbyterian
 0.2% Episcopalian
 0.2% United Methodist
 0.2% Assemblies of God
 1.0% Other

Economy
SkyWest Airlines is headquartered in St. George, and is the primary airline provider at the city's regional airport.
Walmart has a distribution center just outside the city and Family Dollar recently opened a distribution center in the Fort Pierce Industrial Park to better serve the southwest region of the U.S.

The Washington County School District main offices are based in the city.

The Cafe Rio restaurant chain was started in St. George in 1997.

The local economy is largely based on tourism, manufacturing, and new home construction. 
Over a dozen golf courses offering year-round golfing, and various world-recognized events also make for large contributors to the city's economy.

Arts and culture

The City of St. George sponsors art shows and concerts at Vernon Worthen Park.
The Southwest Symphony Orchestra and Southern Utah Heritage Choir are located in St. George.
The up-and-coming Downtown Arts District features "Art Around the Corner" offering outdoor sculptures and statues depicting cultural themes from around the world, and hosts the annual St. George Arts Festival each spring. 
Other major events include the St. George Parade of Homes; the Dixie Roundup Rodeo; St. George Marathon; St. George Ironman triathlon; and the Huntsman World Senior Games.

Venues, museums and sites
 Brigham Young Winter Home and Office
 Burns Arena
 Dixie Center 
 Jacob Hamblin House
 St. George Children's Museum
 St. George Dinosaur Discovery Site
 St. George Utah Temple

Shopping
The city's main retail center is Red Cliffs Mall, built in 1990.

Sports
The St. George community has been the home to two minor-league independent baseball teams. The first, the St. George Pioneerzz (originally the Zion Pioneerzz) who played in the independent Western Baseball League from 1999 to 2001, winning the league championship in 2000. A new franchise, managed by former major league player Darell Evans, was awarded to St. George in 2007. The team, the St. George Roadrunners, played in the independent Golden Baseball League before being taken over by the league and moved to Henderson, Nevada in 2010.

St. George area high schools—Crimson Cliffs, Dixie, Desert Hills, Pine View, and Snow Canyon—all play in 4A state competition as part of 4A Region10 with nearby Hurricane High School in Hurricane and Cedar high school in Cedar City. Utah Tech University participates in the NCAA Division I Western Athletic Conference. In January 2019, Dixie State announced they were reclassifying to NCAA Division I and joining the Western Athletic Conference. Former DSU athletes include Corey Dillon, Anton Palepoi, Reno Mahe, and Scott Brumfield, who all later played in the NFL and Marcus Banks, Lionel Hollins, Keon Clark, and Mo Baker were Dixie players who later played in the NBA. Utah Tech athletes are called Trailblazers (formerly The Rebels and Red Storm), and former Trailblazers Bradley Thompson and Brandon Lyon later played in major league baseball while Bruce Hurst of Dixie High School later played for the Boston Red Sox a pitcher, and then ended up managing the now retired Zion Pioneerzz for its inaugural 1999 season (1999).

St. George has hosted Ironman and Ironman 70.3 events including the 2021 Ironman 70.3 World Championships. In May 2021, the Ironman World Championship hosted by the city due to the COVID-19 and the original venue, Kona, being unable to host. This was the first time that the Ironman World Championship has been hosted outside of Hawai'i.

Parks and recreation
The St. George parks division manages over 20 city parks and nearly 60 miles of paved urban trails interlinking neighborhoods, communities, parks and open space. The city also has over a dozen award-winning golf courses making the area a Southwestern golfing mecca. Major parks and sites include the Canyons Softball Complex; Little Valley Softball Complex; Pioneer Park; Tonaquint Nature Center; nationally-recognized Snake Hollow bike park; Thunder Junction All Abilities theme park; Red Hills Desert Garden - a public water-conservation garden displaying both native and exotic flora suited for the local climate; three local skate parks; Legacy Regional Park and fairgrounds is just east of the city in Hurricane. The St. George area has several public recreation centers; the St. George Rec Center; Washington City Rec Center and the Sand Hollow Aquatics Center. St. George is fast-becoming a popular rock climbing and mountain biking destination.

Government

The city of St. George has a council-manager form of government, with five representatives elected from single-member districts. The mayor, elected at-large, also serves as a member on the City Council. The Council hires a city manager to deal with regular operations. , the mayor of St. George is Michele Randall. The city manager is Adam Lenhard.

Council members are Jimmy Hughes, Michele Randall, Dannielle Larkin, Gregg McArthur, and Bryan Smethurst. City Council meetings are held on the first and third Thursdays of each month at the City Council Chambers.

The U.S. Federal Courthouse, Washington County Justice Court, Juvenile Court and the Fifth District Courthouse are downtown.

Education

Primary and secondary education
The city of St. George is a part of the Washington County School District.
St. George public high schools (10th-12th grade): 
 Dixie High School
 Pine View High School 
 Desert Hills High School
 Snow Canyon High School
 Millcreek Alternative High School
 Crimson Cliffs High School in Washington City (eastern suburb). Its coverage zone extends into southeast St. George.
 Utah Arts Academy in St. George, Utah (northwestern suburb) Offers an alternative education with no tuition costs to any Utah resident.

The city's middle schools are located near or adjacent to the like-named high schools.

Intermediate (6th-7th grade) and middle schools (8th-9th grade):
 Dixie Middle School
 Pine View Middle School
 Desert Hills Middle School
 Snow Canyon Middle School
 Crimson Cliffs Middle School in Washington City 
 Washington Fields Intermediate in Washington City
 Tonaquint Intermediate
 Sunrise Ridge Intermediate
 Fossil Ridge Intermediate
 Lava Ridge Intermediate in Santa Clara (western suburb)

Higher education
 Dixie Technical College with 4,920 post-secondary and 292 secondary students (as of 2018). Dixie Technical College opened a new main campus on the site of the old St. George Airport in 2018.
 Rocky Vista University College of Osteopathic Medicine 
 University of Phoenix
 Utah Tech University, a four-year institution, of about 10,000 students

The Southern Utah Center for Computer, Engineering, and Science Students (SUCCESS) is an early college high school located on the Utah Tech University campus.

Media

Radio

Newspapers
 The Spectrum, which is owned by Gannett, is the local daily newspaper. 
 The Independent newspaper offers a monthly print edition featuring local news, arts, entertainment & events coverage. It also provides free online daily news and an online community events calendar.
 St. George News (stgnews.com) is free-access online news. 
 Southern Utah Weekly is a weekly newspaper
The Salt Lake Tribune, Deseret News, Las Vegas Review-Journal and Las Vegas Sun are also widely distributed in St. George and offer home delivery.

Other publications include St. George Magazine, a monthly magazine covering a variety of local content, and View on Southern Utah is a magazine offering a variety of content for the southern Utah, southern Nevada and northwestern Arizona area.

Television
Like other major cities in Utah, St. George is in the Salt Lake City market, so it has only one television station licensed to the city, KMYU, a MyNetworkTV affiliate. It is carried in HD on Dish Network and DirecTV, as well as on Comcast Ch. 643 in Salt Lake City, and on Ch. 20 on local cable, TDS Communications, formerly Baja Broadband. KMYU (known as My Utah TV) is sister station to KUTV-DT, and is operated out of KUTV's offices in Salt Lake City, although the station has a news bureau with a reporter and photographer based in St. George.

Also in St. George are the offices of Cedar City, Utah–licensed KCSG Channel 14, a MeTV affiliate, which broadcasts local news. The city also receives local TV channels from Salt Lake City with broadcast translators in the St. George area.

The Las Vegas NBC affiliate, KSNV-DT, has a local translator owned by Cherry Creek Radio, KVBT-LP channel 41, on which some of its programming airs two hours later than the same programming broadcast on Salt Lake City NBC affiliate KSL-TV.

Infrastructure

Healthcare
St. George Regional Hospital is an Intermountain Health Care hospital and is the only 24-hour trauma center between Las Vegas and the Wasatch Front, serving the tri-state region of southern Utah, northwest Arizona and southeastern Nevada.

Utilities
St. George is served by City of St. George Power, which serves most of the city, and Dixie Power, which serves southern areas of the city. Rocky Mountain Power serves parts of the greater St. George area. The municipal water department obtains its own water from wells located near Gunlock and in Snow Canyon State Park, Mountain Springs on Pine Valley Mountain. It also purchases wholesale water from the Washington County Water Conservancy District which is sourced from the Virgin River and purified at the Quail Creek Water Treatment Plant.

Transportation

St. George Regional Airport is located in southeast St. George on Airport Parkway. The airport is served by American Airlines, Delta Air Lines, and United Airlines. As of 2020, two-way flights to Salt Lake City, Denver, Phoenix, Los Angeles and seasonal flights to Dallas–Fort Worth were available.

Local and regional transportation
SunTran is the local public transit system and operates seven fixed-routes serving most areas of St. George, Washington and Ivins.
Rent-A-Bike and 'Spin' scooters are available for rated use in numerous locations city-wide.
Greyhound serves St. George on its Denver-Las Vegas and Salt Lake City-Las Vegas routes. Greyhound connects with Amtrak's California Zephyr in Salt Lake City. St. George is also served by the bus company Tufesa and the shuttle companies Salt Lake Express and St. George Shuttle.

Major highways
Interstate 15 runs northeast-southwest through St. George.
SR-7 (Southern Parkway) runs east-west through the southern periphery of the city.
SR-8 (Sunset Boulevard) runs east-west through west St. George
SR-34 (St. George Boulevard) runs east-west through central St. George
SR-18 (Bluff Street) runs north-south through St. George

Notable people
Robert Adamson (b. 1985), actor (Lincoln Heights)
 Texas Rose Bascom (1922–1993), rodeo performer, trick roper, Hollywood actress, National Cowgirl Hall Of Fame inductee, Utah Cowboy Hall of Fame inductee
Jay Don Blake (b. 1958), professional and NCAA champion golfer 
Wilford Brimley, American actor and singer
Juanita Brooks, Mormon writer, editor and historian
Howard Cannon, former United States Senator from Nevada 
Asia Carrera, adult film star
LaVell Edwards (1930–2016), former BYU football coach 
Jada Facer, actress and singer
Dia Frampton, runner-up in inaugural season of The Voice
 Orval Hafen, lawyer, legislator, and community advocate
Tracy Hickman, fantasy author
Jeffrey R. Holland, LDS general authority
Bruce Hurst (b. 1958), former Major League Baseball pitcher
Doug Jolley (b. 1979), NFL tight end
Steven Koecher, living in St. George at the time he disappeared.
Meg and Dia, rock group
The Piano Guys, classical music group, formed in 2010
Amanda Righetti (b. 1983), actress (The OC, Reunion, The Mentalist)
Gaskell Romney (1871–1955), Mormon leader, father of George W. Romney, grandfather of Mitt Romney
Miles Romney (1806–1877), settler, Mormon leader
Miles Park Romney (1843–1904), attorney, police chief
J. Edwin Seegmiller (1923–1986), physician and medical researcher, National Academy of Sciences, faculty member UCSD Medical School
Steven E. Snow, (b. 1949), lawyer, LDS general authority, Church Historian and Recorder
John "Cat" Thompson (1906–1990), basketball player; member of the Basketball Hall of Fame
Tanya Tucker (b. 1958), country music singer, raised in St. George
Brendon Urie (b. 1987), singer-songwriter, musician, multi-instrumentalist, lead vocalist of Panic! at the Disco
Joyce Vance, U.S. Attorney for the Northern District of Alabama and media legal analyst

See also

References

External links
 
 
 
 St. George tourism
 Nuclear waste in St. George

 
Cities in Washington County, Utah
Cities in the Mojave Desert
Cities in Utah
County seats in Utah
Pleistocene volcanism
Populated places established in 1861
Old Spanish Trail (trade route)
1861 establishments in Utah Territory